Phyllopalpus pulchellus, known generally as the red headed bush cricket, handsome trig or handsome bush cricket, is a species of winged bush crickets, trigs in the family Gryllidae. It is found in North America.

During courtship, males first provide females a nuptial gift before transferring a larger spermatophore. If the female does not accept the nuptial gift (also known as a microspermatophore) the male will eat it.

References

Further reading

External links

 

Crickets
Articles created by Qbugbot
Insects described in 1864